Sojat Road railway station is a railway station in Pali district, Rajasthan. Its code is SOD. It serves Sojat Road town. The station consists of 2 platforms. Passenger, Express, and Superfast trains halt here.

References

Railway stations in Pali district
Ajmer railway division